Seif Samir (born 5 June 1993) is an Egyptian basketball player for Al Ahly and the Egyptian national team, where he participated at the 2014 FIBA Basketball World Cup.

References

External links
Seif Samir at Afrobasket.com

1993 births
Living people
Egyptian men's basketball players
Power forwards (basketball)
Small forwards
2014 FIBA Basketball World Cup players
Al Ahly basketball players